Lenard Chroen (former Kren) was a 16th-century politician in Slovenia when the country was under the Holy Roman Empire. He became mayor of Ljubljana in 1565.
He was succeeded by Mihael Vodapiuez in 1567. He was father of the princebishop Thomas Chroen of Ljubljana.

References

Mayors of places in the Holy Roman Empire
Mayors of Ljubljana
Year of birth missing
Year of death missing
16th-century Slovenian people